Kevin Joseph Michael Gournay CBE FMedSci FRCN FRSM FRCPsych (Hon) PhD RN CSci Cert CBT is a registered psychologist, chartered scientist and a registered nurse by background. He is an emeritus professor at the Institute of Psychiatry, King's College London. He was a consultant psychologist at the Priory Hospital North London; retiring in December 2018. He has now returned to clinical work as part of the response to COVID19. He is currently an Honorary Professor at the Matilda Centre; University of Sydney., where his work focusses on the impact of COVID19 on mental health and the combination of mental health problems and substance use. He has been responsible over many years for a very wide range of research, policy and practice development in mental health care. He also works as an Expert Witness; he has provided reports on more than 300 suicides; 20 homicides and hundreds of reports on people who have suffered the consequences of traumatic events, including accidents, terrorist related incidents, natural disasters, war related events and stillbirth and perinatal death. He has also provided numerous reports on patients receiving care and treatment in high secure and Medium secure settings, including Broadmoor, Rampton and Ashworth hospitals

Initiatives
He has been responsible for a number of initiatives that have improved mental health care, including:
 Guidance on the Observation of Patients at Risk in Mental Health Services
 UKCC Report on the Management of Violence in Mental Health Settings
 Chair, NICE Guidance on the Short Term Management of Disturbed/Violent Behaviour in Mental Health and Emergency Settings
 Serving as a special advisor to the UK Joint Parliamentary Committee on Human Rights
 Consultant to World Health Organization

Affiliations
Gournay has served on numerous government bodies. He is President and founding Patron of  No Panic, one of the UK's largest anxiety disorders charity. He has a number of visiting Professorships and honorary doctorates from various UK and Australian Universities.

Fellowships
He was made a Fellow of the Royal College of Nursing in 1998.
Royal College of Psychiatrists (Honorary)
Academy of Medical Sciences
Royal Society of Medicine
Associate Fellow of the British Psychological Society

Awards
CBE : Queens New Year's Honours 1999 
Honorary Doctor of Science
Nurse of the Year (American Psychiatric Nursing Association, 2004)

Clinical expertise
He originally trained as a Behaviour Therapist at the Maudsley Hospital between 1976– 1978 on the famous Nurse Therapy Programme, directed by Professor Isaac Marks. His doctoral thesis focussed on a randomised controlled trial on treatments for Agoraphobia. Throughout his career, since he completed his training in 1978, he has worked as a Consultant Psychologist, treating literally thousands of patients with a range of anxiety disorders, OCD, PTSD and mood disorders. Although he retired from clinical work in December 2018, he has now returned as part of the response to the Covid19 pandemic.

Research and teaching and other activities
Gournay has held major research grants,  since 1980, notably in the cognitive behavioural treatment of phobic anxiety, body image disorders, the use of medication, epidemiology, health economics and community mental health. He is an Honorary Professor at the Matilda Centre, University of Sydney, where he spends several weeks each year. He has considerable media experience with numerous contributions to TV, Radio, Newspapers, Journals and Magazines.

Gournay set up and ran the UK's first multi-disciplinary Masters programme for mental health professionals in the area of interventions for serious mental illness. He has had attachments Universities and Services in the UK, Ireland, USA and Australia, where he has taught on the subjects of post traumatic stress and the management of severe mental illness. He has directed a number of training programmes for mental health professionals (doctors, psychologists and nurses) and his experience includes teaching in a number of countries including other European countries as well as the United States, Canada, Australia, New Zealand, the Czech Republic, Palestine and Russia.

Gournay has a range of other interests.  He acts as a clinical advisor to an organisation that provides enhanced supported living for people with a mental illness. He serves as a member of the Psychiatry Council of the Royal Society of Medicine.

He is a supporter and season ticket holder of Charlton Athletic FC; his Dad Joe took him to his first match in 1951. He is a member of Broxbourne Running Club and the Veteran of 17 Marathons. He lives in Hertfordshire with his wife Jean and has 4 children and 3 grandchildren.

Publications
Gournay is the author or editor of 17 books and monographs and more than 300 chapters, articles, books and conference papers.

Some Books/monographs
Marel C, Siedlecka E, Fisher A, Gournay K, Deady M, Baker A, Kay-Lambkin F, Teesson M, Baillee A, Mills K. (2022). Guidelines on the management of co-occurring alcohol and other drug and mental health in alcohol and other drug treatment settings (3rd edition) Matilda Centre, University of Sydney
Gournay K Ashcroft B (2019) Hope and Healing after Stillbirth and early baby loss: Sheldon,London
Gournay K (2019) Ffobia a Phanig (Welsh Language version) Short Guide to Phobias and Panic; Sheldon
Gournay K (2015) Post Traumatic Stress Disorder; Recovery after accident and disaster; Sheldon, London 
Gournay K (2015) Short Guide to Phobias and Panic; Sheldon, London 
Gournay K Robson D (2014) Coping with schizophrenia; Sheldon, London 
Gournay K Piper R Rogers P (2012) Coping with Obsessive Compulsive Disorder; Sheldon, London 
Newell, R., Gournay, K. (2010) – Mental Health Nursing: an evidence based approach. Harcourt Brace: London. 
Lloyd C King R Deane F Gournay K (2009); Clinical Management in Mental Health Services; Wiley: Blackwell: Oxford.  
Goldberg, D., Gournay, K. (1997) – The general practitioner, the psychiatrist and the burden of mental health care. Maudsley Discussion Paper No 1: Institute of Psychiatry, London. 
Gournay, K. (1989) – Agoraphobia: Current Perspectives on Theory and Treatment. Routledge, London.

Some Journal articles

 Bower M, Smout S, Donohoe-Bales A,O’Dean S, Teesson L, Boyle J, Lim D, Nguyen A, Calear AL, Batterham PJ, Gournay K and Teesson M (2023) A hidden pandemic? An umbrella review of global evidence on mental health in the time of COVID-19.Front. Psychiatry 14:1107560. doi: 10.3389/fpsyt.2023.1107560
 Bower, M., Buckle, C., Rugel, E., Donohoe-Bales, A.,McGrath, L., Gournay, K., Barrett, E., Phibbs, P., Teesson, M. (2021). 'Trapped', 'anxious' and 'traumatised': COVID-19 intensified the impact of housing inequality on Australians' mental health. International Journal of Housing Policy, Forthcoming Special Issue on COVID-19 and Housing. http://dx.doi.org/10.1080/19491247.2021.1940686
 Gournay K Winstanley K Mancey-Johnson A Tracey N (2019) Supported living: a solution – enhanced supported living and a description of a nationwide initiative:British Journal of Mental Health Nursing https://doi.org/10.12968/bjmh.2019.0034
 Veale, D., Papageorgiou, Ali S. & Gournay, K. (2019). The psychiatric ward environment and nursing observations at night. A qualitative study. Journal of Psychiatric and Mental Health Nursing.
 First published: 10 December 2019 https://doi.org/10.1111/jpm.12583
 Gournay K (2017) Editorial: Guidelines on the management of co-occurring alcohol and other drug and mental health conditions in alcohol and other drug treatment settings in    Australia: Advances in Dual Diagnosis Vol. 10:  1- 3
 Marel C, Mills KL, Kingston R, Gournay K, Deady M, Kay-Lambkin F, Baker A, Teesson M (2016). Guidelines on the management of co-occurring alcohol and other drug and mental health in alcohol and other drug treatment settings (2nd edition). Sydney, Australia: Centre of Research Excellence in Mental Health and Substance Use, National Drug and Alcohol Research Centre, University of New South Wales.
Craig T Johnson S McCrone P Afuwape S Hughes E Gournay K Boardman J Wanigaratne S White I Leese M Thornicroft G (2008):  A randomised controlled trial of integrated mental health care for dual diagnosis: Mental Health, Social functioning and healthcare cost outcomes at 18 months
Rofail, D., Gray, R., Gournay, K. (2005) – The development and internal consistency of the satisfaction with antipsychotic medication scale, Psychological Medicine. 35, pp. 1–10.
Gray, R., Wykes, T., Gournay, K. (2004) Randomised controlled trial of medication management training for mental health nurses, British Journal of Psychiatry, 185, pp. 157–162.
Wright, S., Gournay, K., Glorney, E., Thornicroft, G. (2002) – Dual diagnosis in the suburbs: violence and offending, Journal of Forensic Psychiatry, 13(1), pp. 35–52.
Walburn, J., Gray, R., Gournay, K., Quraishi, S., David, A. (2001) – Systematic review of patient and nurse attitudes to depot antipsychotic medication, British Journal of Psychiatry, 179, pp. 300–307.
Gournay, K., Denford, L., Parr, A-M, Newell, R. (2000)- British nurses in behavioural psychotherapy: a 25-year follow up, Journal of Advanced Nursing 32, 2, pp. 343–351.

Sources
Biodata

Academics of King's College London
British non-fiction writers
Nurses from London
Nursing researchers
British psychologists
Commanders of the Order of the British Empire
Living people
Fellows of the Royal College of Nursing
Year of birth missing (living people)
Place of birth missing (living people)
Fellows of the Royal College of Psychiatrists
Fellows of the Academy of Medical Sciences (United Kingdom)
British male writers
Male non-fiction writers

British nurses